Maryland Route 407 (MD 407) is a state highway in the U.S. state of Maryland.  Known as Marston Road, the state highway runs  from MD 31 near Marston east to MD 27 near Taylorsville.  MD 407 was constructed in the early to mid-1930s.

Route description

MD 407 begins at an intersection with MD 31 (New Windsor Road) northwest of Marston and south of New Windsor.  The state highway heads southeast as a two-lane undivided road through farmland to the village of Marston, where the highway turns east at a three-way junction with South Marston Road.  East of Marston, MD 407 veers southeast and passes through the hamlet of Dennings.  The state highway reaches its eastern terminus at MD 27 (Ridge Road) north of Taylorsville.  The roadway continues southeast as county-maintained Baker Road, which leads to the historic McMurray-Frizzell-Aldridge Farm.

History
Construction on the first section of MD 407 from MD 31 through Marston began shortly after 1930.  That section and a second segment to west of Dennings were completed as a concrete road by 1933.  The final portion through Dennings to MD 27 was completed in 1936.  MD 407 has changed very little since it was constructed.

Junction list

See also

References

External links

MDRoads: MD 407

407
Maryland Route 407